Cut Knife may refer to:
 Cut Knife, Saskatchewan, a town in Canada
 Cut Knife (electoral district), a former provincial electoral district in Saskatchewan, Canada
 Rural Municipality of Cut Knife No. 439, a rural municipality in Saskatchewan, Canada
 Cut Knife Airport
 Battle of Cut Knife, during the North-West Rebellion